Psychrobacter jeotgali is a species of bacteria named after jeotgal, a traditional Korean fermented seafood, where it was first isolated. It is a Gram-negative, non-motile, non-spore-forming, and moderately halophilic coccus. The type strain is YKJ-103T (=KCCM 41559T =JCM 11463T).

References

Further reading
Whitman, William B., et al., eds. Bergey's manual® of systematic bacteriology. Vol. 5. Springer, 2012.
Dworkin, Martin, and Stanley Falkow, eds. The Prokaryotes: Vol. 6: Proteobacteria: Gamma Subclass. Vol. 6. Springer, 2006.

External links
LPSN
Type strain of Psychrobacter jeotgali at BacDive -  the Bacterial Diversity Metadatabase

Moraxellaceae
Bacteria described in 2003